There are one peninsula, one main island, and several small artificial islands in the Macao Special Administrative Region. The main island is located to the south of the Macau Peninsula and at the east of Hengqin Island of the Pearl River (Zhujiang), Guangdong Province, China. The island remains unnamed since its creation in the late 1990s, after the reclamation project of Cotai which filled up the channel between the islands of Coloane and Taipa.

Historically, the unnamed island was under the administration of the Concelho das Ilhas, 

The Macau Peninsula was once an island on the Pearl River Delta. It has linked to Zhongshan Island as a result of sedimentation and became a peninsula approx. two thousand years ago. Apart from this case, all of the Macanese former islands were merged either to the Macau Peninsula or the newly unnamed island directly or indirectly as the result of artificial land reclamation.

Peninsulas 
 Macau Peninsula – itself a part of Zhongshan Island
 Monte Ká Hó, eastnortheastern part of Coloane
 Coloane B Power Station
 Taipa Ferry Terminal
 Ilha Verde (former island)

Islands

Entirely 
 Aterro da "Zona A" dos Novos Aterros Urbanos (artificial island)
 Aterro da "Zona C" dos Novos Aterros Urbanos (artificial island)
 The island comprising Coloane, Cotai, and Taipa (main island)
 The island containing the runway and taxiways of Macau International Airport (artificial island)

Partly 
 Hong Kong–Zhuhai–Macau Bridge Island (artificial island) – the southern part of the island is a part of Macau, containing the Zhuhai-Macau Checkpoint

Leased 
 Hengqin (formerly known as Dom João e Montanha of the Lapa, Dom João, and Montanha Islands) – a part of the island is under Macanese administration as per a 40-year lease signed on 27 June 2009 between the Government of Macau and the Chinese Central Government

Islets 
  (artificial islet) 
 Islets in the Nam Van Lake
  (artificial islet)

Former islands 
 Coloane Island
 Ilha Kai Kiong – connected to the apron of Macau International Airport, Taipa in 1995
 Ilha Verde – connected to the Macau Peninsula in 1895 when a causeway (now Avenida do Conselheiro Borja) was built
 Ilhéu das Lázaras – connected to the north-east of Coloane
 Ilhéu de Macau-Siac – connected to the north-east of the Macau Peninsula in January 1921, during the landfilling works for Macau's Outer Harbour expansion
 Macau Island
 Pedra d'Areca
 Taipa Island – was itself two smaller islands

See also
 Geography of Macau
 List of islands and peninsulas of Hong Kong
 Lists of islands

References

External links 
 Macao Online Map, Government of Macau – Direcção dos Serviços de Cartografia e Cadastro (Cartography and Cadastre Bureau)

Macau
Macau Peninsula
Islands of Macau
Islands of the South China Sea
Macau